Play in Group H of the 2006 FIFA World Cup began on 14 June and completed on 23 June 2006. Spain won the group and advanced to the round of 16, along with Ukraine. Tunisia and Saudi Arabia failed to advance.

Standings

Spain advanced to play France (runners-up of Group G) in the round of 16.
Ukraine advanced to play Switzerland (winners of Group G) in the round of 16.

Matches
All times local (CEST/UTC+2)

Spain vs Ukraine

Tunisia vs Saudi Arabia

Saudi Arabia vs Ukraine

Spain vs Tunisia

Saudi Arabia vs Spain

Ukraine vs Tunisia

H group
Group
Group
group
Saudi Arabia at the 2006 FIFA World Cup